The Nick & Knight Tour is a co-headlining tour by American recording artists Nick Carter and Jordan Knight. The tour supported their collaborative studio album, Nick & Knight. The tour began September 2014 in Nashville, Tennessee and played over 30 shows in the United States and Canada.

Background
According to Knight, the two spoke of a possible collaboration during their time with supergroup NKOTBSB. Initially, the two were planning to conduct a co-headlining tour, promoting previous and forthcoming solo projects. After the 2011-12 tour, they decided to collaborate on a single, which eventually grew into Knight and Carter completing an entire album.

In April 2014, the duo made an appearance on the American morning show, Good Morning America. During the appearance, they announced their single, album and tour. The show has been described as a big party. Despite being performed in nightclubs and theatres, each show will possess the energy of an arena gig. The two will perform songs from their new album, alongside their solo hits. A homage to boy bands will be performed, as well as a tribute to music that has inspired both Carter and Knight.

Opening act
Mix Master Wood

Set list
This set list was obtained from the September 24, 2014 concert in Minneapolis, at Mill City Nights. It does not represent all concerts during the tour. 
"Nobody Better"
"Burning Up" / "Let's Go Higher
"Just the Two of Us" (contains elements of "It Takes Two")
"Take Me Home"
"Instrumental Sequence"
"Halfway There"
"If You Go Away"
"Paper"
"Drive My Car"
"Easy Lover" / "Addicted to Love"
"If You Want It to Be Good Girl (Get Yourself a Bad Boy)" / "No Diggity" / "Gettin' Jiggy wit It"/ "Hip Hop Hooray" / "Jump" / "Creep" / "Thong Song" / "Pony"
"Switch"
"Deja Vu"
"If You Want It"
"Instrumental Sequence"
"One More Time" (Carter solo)
"Give It to You" (Knight solo)
"You Got It (The Right Stuff)" / "Larger than Life"

Tour dates

Box office score data

References

2014 concert tours
Co-headlining concert tours